Roger Bielle (25 August 1928 – 11 December 2014) was a French wrestler. He competed at the 1952, 1956, 1960 and the 1964 Summer Olympics.

References

External links
 

1928 births
2014 deaths
French male sport wrestlers
Olympic wrestlers of France
Wrestlers at the 1952 Summer Olympics
Wrestlers at the 1956 Summer Olympics
Wrestlers at the 1960 Summer Olympics
Wrestlers at the 1964 Summer Olympics
Sportspeople from Gironde